Alpine Astrovillage (AAV) is a center for astrophotography and stargazing in the eastern Swiss Alps, high above the valley floor of the Val Müstair in the canton Graubünden. It was founded by Drs. Vaclav & Jitka Ourednik during the International Year of Astronomy 2009. The complete name is Alpine Astrovillage Lü-Stailas (for “star light” in the Romansh language of the Canton). With its geographic location at an altitude above  and an exquisite sky quality with minimal light pollution, AAV is a unique place in Central Europe for all astronomical purposes. The program includes multi-day courses in astrophotography and sky observation. In collaboration with schools, AAV offers students the possibility to accomplish, under competent guidance, the practical parts of their matura (or Bachelor) or Masters projects.

AAV also organizes and supervises astrophotography trips to the darkest places on Earth, including visits to the most famous and biggest professional observatories. Meanwhile, the Center enjoys, thanks to its educative activities, great national and international popularity and respect. For years, it has been known as an Erlebnisperle des Kantons Graubünden (Destination Pearl of the canton Graubünden). With its activity, the Center contributes in an important way to the preservation of the last dark sky oases on the planet for the coming generations.

See also 
 List of astronomical observatories
 List of astronomical societies

References 
 (English) "Unique Telescope Facility Opens In Swiss Biosphere" Report about AAV in the Online-Journal Universe Today
 (German) "Starparade: Vom Hirn zum Gestirn" Report by Marcel Huwyler about the AAV center and Drs. Jitka and Vaclav Ourednik, Schweizer Illustrierte
 (German) "Was Lü mit den Sternen zu tun hat …" A feature about the astrofotografie at the AAV Center, Fotointern.ch
 (German) "Sternenstaub und Schneekristalle" Report in the Neue Zürcher Zeitung  
 (German) "Das Alpine Astrovillage – ein Astrofotografie-Zentrum in den Schweizer Alpen" A movie feature about the AAV center in the German TV, Bayerischer Rundfunk
 (German) "So gut wie in Lü sieht man den nächtlichen Himmel nirgends – das Bergdorf im Münstertal weist weitere Besonderheiten auf  Lü" Report about the AAV Center, Neuen Zürcher Zeitung
 (German) "Ausflugstipp Ganz grosses Himmelskino" Report about the AAV Center, Beobachter
 (German) "Lü Stailas steht vor Wendepunkt" Report about the AAV Center, Südostschveiz
 (German) "Freie Sicht aufs Sternmeer" Report about the AAV Center and its founders Jitka and Vaclav Ourednik Schweizer Familie
 (German) "Klare Sicht auf die Milchstrasse" Chapter about the AAV Center in the book 111 Orte in Graubünden, die man gesehen haben muss
 (German) "Dr. Vaclav Ourednik" on line artickle about the AAV center and Dr. V. Ourednik, Fotosymposiums Pix17

External links
Alpine Astrovillage Lü-Stailas observatory home page
(English) (French) (Italian) Homepage of the UNESCO Biosphären Reservat "Val Müstair – Schweizer
(German) (English) (French) (Czech) Caelus Edition associated with the AAV Center. It publishes non-fiction books, audioplays and other publications about the cosmos and astrophotography
 (German) (English) (French) (Italien) Tourism Engadin – Scuol – Samnaun – Val Müstair

Astronomical observatories in Switzerland
Val Müstair
Astrophotography
UNESCO
Public observatories
Education in Switzerland